Happysad (stylized as happysad) is a Polish rock band created in Skarżysko-Kamienna in 2001. Their first album Wszystko jedno was released in 2004. The second album Podróże z i pod prąd was released in 2005. The band plays melodic rock with elements of punk and reggae.

The band went on multiple national tours in Poland.

Members

Current Line-Up 
 Jakub „Quka” Kawalec – vocals, guitar, lyrics
 Łukasz „Pan Latawiec” Cegliński – guitar
 Artur „Artour” Telka – bass
 Jarosław „Dubin” Dubiński – drums
 Maciej „Ramzej” Ramisz – musical keyboard, guitar, vocals
 Michał „Misiek” Bąk – saxophone, musical keyboard, vocals

Former Members 
 Paweł Półtorak – drums (2002)
 Piotr „Szosiu” Szostak – drums (2003)
 Maciek „Ponton” Sosnowski – drums (2003/2006)

Discography

Studio albums

Tribute albums

Live albums

Video albums

References

External links 

 Official website of the band

Polish rock music groups
Mystic Production artists